Lime Lake is a hamlet and census-designated place (CDP) in the northeast part of the town of Machias, in Cattaraugus County, New York, United States. As of the 2010 census, it had a population of 867. Prior to the 2010 census, the area was delineated as part of the Lime Lake-Machias CDP.

Geography
The area is bordered to the south by the main hamlet of Machias.

The outlet of Lime Lake flows north to Elton Creek in Delevan, which then continues north to Cattaraugus Creek, a west-flowing tributary of Lake Erie. Less than one mile south of Lime Lake and only a few feet higher is the drainage divide between the Great Lakes watershed to the north and the Mississippi River watershed to the south: Ischua Creek flows south to Olean Creek, a tributary of the Allegheny River, then the Ohio River, and finally the Mississippi.

New York State Route 16 and Cattaraugus County Route 70 connect Lime Lake to Machias.

Demographics

Notable people
Jeffrey J. Miller, author and historian
Jim Murray, Pulitzer Prize winning sportswriter, worked as a dishwasher/busboy at the Lime Lake Hotel during the 1930s.

References

Census-designated places in New York (state)
Hamlets in Cattaraugus County, New York
Hamlets in New York (state)